SM UB-53 was a German Type UB III submarine or U-boat in the Imperial German Navy during World War I. She was commissioned into the Pola Flotilla of the German Imperial Navy on 21 August 1917 as SM UB-53.

She operated as part of the Pola Flotilla based in Cattaro. On 7 April 1918 the submarine saw an airship catch fire accidentally and crash into the sea near the Strait of Otranto with the loss of all hands. It apparently was the German Navy Zeppelin L 59, modified for long-range flights, on the outbound leg of a flight from Yambol, Bulgaria, in an attempt to bomb the Royal Navy base at Malta.

Construction

UB-53 was ordered by the GIN on 20 May 1916. She was built by Blohm & Voss, Hamburg and following just under a year of construction, launched at Hamburg on 9 March 1917. UB-53 was commissioned later that same year under the command of Kptlt. Robert Sprenger.
Like all Type UB III submarines, UB-53 carried 10 torpedoes and was armed with a  deck gun. UB-53 had a displacement of  while surfaced and  when submerged. Her engines enabled her to travel at  when surfaced and  when submerged.

Summary of raiding history

References

Notes

Citations

Bibliography 

 

German Type UB III submarines
World War I submarines of Germany
U-boats commissioned in 1917
U-boats sunk in 1918
Maritime incidents in 1918
World War I shipwrecks in the Mediterranean Sea
U-boats sunk by mines
1917 ships
Ships built in Hamburg